Hasselmo is a surname. Notable people with the surname include:

Ann Die Hasselmo, American college president
Michael Hasselmo, American neuroscientist
Nils Hasselmo (1931–2019), American university president